Wranitzky is a Czech surname. Notable people with the surname include:

 Paul Wranitzky (1756–1808), composer and violinist
 Anton Wranitzky (1761–1820), composer and violinist
 Karoline Seidler-Wranitzky (1790–1872), singer
  (1798–1839), cellist